The 1975–76 I-Divisioona season was the second season of the I-Divisioona, the second level of Finnish ice hockey. 10 teams participated in the league, and Kiekko-Reipas won the championship.

Regular season

External links
 Season on hockeyarchives.info

I-Divisioona seasons
2
Fin